Cornelia Wilhelmina "Willemijn" Fock (25 June 1942 – 3 June 2021) was a Dutch art historian. She was professor of the history of applied arts at Leiden University.

Career
Fock obtained her doctorate at Leiden University in 1975 with a dissertation on Jacques Bylivelt at the court of Florence. In 1982, she became a professor of the history of applied arts at the same university. She was mainly concerned with the history of interior decoration and furniture, tapestries and goldsmithing. She wrote books about residential culture and Rapenburg in Leiden. Fock retired in 2007. In 2019, she was awarded an honorary membership of the Vereniging van Nederlandse Kunsthistorici (Association of Dutch Art Historians).

Fock died on 3 June 2021.

Bibliography
 Cornelia Willemina Fock: Jaques Bylivelt aan het hof van Florence. Goudsmeden en steensnijders in dienst van de eerste groothertogen van Toscane. Alphen aan de Rijn, Visdruk, 1975. Geen ISBN.                 	
 Willemijn Fock: Het Nederlandse interieur in beeld 1600-1900. Zwolle, Waanders, 2001. ISBN 90-400-9588-4
 Th.H. Lunsingh Scheurleer, C. Willemijn Fock, A.J. van Dissel: Het Rapenburg; geschiedenis van een Leidse gracht; Deel I; Groenhazenburch. Leiden, Rijksuniversiteit Leiden, 1986. ISBN 9064711798
 Th.H. Lunsingh Scheurleer, C. Willemijn Fock, A.J. van Dissel: Het Rapenburg; geschiedenis van een Leidse gracht; Deel II; De paplepel. Leiden, Rijksuniversiteit Leiden, 1987.  ISBN 9064711968
 Th.H. Lunsingh Scheurleer, C. Willemijn Fock, A.J. van Dissel: Het Rapenburg; geschiedenis van een Leidse gracht; Deel III; Meyenburch. Leiden, Rijksuniversiteit Leiden, 1988. ISBN 906471214X
 Th.H. Lunsingh Scheurleer, C. Willemijn Fock, A.J. van Dissel: Het Rapenburg; geschiedenis van een Leidse gracht; Deel IV; Leeuwenhorst. Leiden, Rijksuniversiteit Leiden, 1989. ISBN 906471231X
 Th.H. Lunsingh Scheurleer, C. Willemijn Fock, A.J. van Dissel:  Het Rapenburg; geschiedenis van een Leidse gracht; Deel V; 's; Gravensteyn. Leiden, Rijksuniversiteit Leiden, 1990. ISBN 9064712409
 Th.H. Lunsingh Scheurleer, C. Willemijn Fock, A.J. van Dissel: Het Rapenburg; geschiedenis van een Leidse gracht; Deel VI; Het; Rijck van Pallas. Leiden, Rijksuniversiteit Leiden, 1992. ISBN 9789064712609
 C. Willemijn Fock: Het Rapenburg; geschiedenis van een Leidse gracht; Index van personen betreft delen I-V. Leiden, Rijksuniversiteit Leiden, 1992. ISBN 906471262X

References

1942 births
2021 deaths
People from Surabaya
Dutch art historians
Leiden University alumni
Academic staff of Leiden University
Women art historians